Teejay Haichert (née Surik, born September 8, 1983 in Biggar, Saskatchewan) is a Canadian curler from Swift Current, Saskatchewan.

Haichert played third for Marliese Kasner at the 2003 Canadian Junior Curling Championships which they won. They then won the World Junior Curling Championships that year, defeating the U.S. in the final. Haichert skipped her own Junior rink to a Saskatchewan provincial championship the following year. At the 2004 Canadian Junior Curling Championships, Surik's team finished with an 8-4 record, just out of the playoffs in 4th place.

In 2007, Haichert's then boyfriend moved to Yellowknife to be a firefighter, and Surik went with him, and she then joined up with Kerry Galusha. The new team won the Yukon/Northwest Territories championship in 2008, and Surik played in her first Scotties Tournament of Hearts where the team finished with a disappointing 1-10 record.

Haichert would later move back to Saskatchewan, and last played competitively for Jolene Campbell in the 2014-15 season.

References

External links

 Playing for NWT bringing Surik home
 Surik, Teejay - "Biggar Encyclopedia"

Living people
Curlers from the Northwest Territories
Curlers from Regina, Saskatchewan
Sportspeople from Yellowknife
Canadian women curlers
Canadian mixed curling champions
People from Biggar, Saskatchewan
People from Swift Current
1983 births